Alex Chandre de Oliveira or simply Tico (21 December 1977 – 14 June 2014) was a Brazilian football player who played as a striker.

He played for Zhejiang Greentown between 2006 and 2007. He died of a heart attack at his home in Curitiba.

References

External links

1977 births
Brazilian footballers
Brazilian expatriate footballers
Brasiliense Futebol Clube players
Paraná Clube players
Chengdu Tiancheng F.C. players
Daejeon Hana Citizen FC players
Avaí FC players
Montedio Yamagata players
Esporte Clube Bahia players
Zhejiang Professional F.C. players
Associação Desportiva São Caetano players
Expatriate footballers in China
Brazilian expatriate sportspeople in Portugal
Expatriate footballers in Portugal
Brazilian expatriate sportspeople in South Korea
Expatriate footballers in South Korea
Expatriate footballers in Japan
Brazilian expatriate sportspeople in China
Chinese Super League players
China League One players
J2 League players
K League 1 players
2014 deaths
Footballers from Curitiba
Association football defenders
Santa Helena Esporte Clube players